Johan Kristofer Nilsson Guiomar (born 15 March 1985) is a Swedish former professional footballer who played as a defender.

References

External links
 

1985 births
Living people
Association football defenders
Malmö FF players
Mjällby AIF players
Trelleborgs FF players
Kongsvinger IL Toppfotball players
Allsvenskan players
Superettan players
Norwegian First Division players
Swedish footballers
Swedish expatriate footballers
Expatriate footballers in Norway